Glendale University College of Law (GUCL) is a private, for-profit law school in Glendale, California.  Graduates are qualified to sit the California State Bar, but because the school is not accredited by the American Bar Association, they are not generally eligible to take the bar or practice outside of California. Of the fourteen GUCL graduates who took the California Bar Exam for the first time in July 2019, nine passed, for a 64% passage rate.

History

GUCL was founded by Seymour Greitzer and Julius Alpheus Leetham in 1967 as the Glendale College of Law.  Although it is not a university, the institution renamed itself Glendale University College of Law in 1975.

The two founders believed that ABA law school accreditation standards discouraged the evening study of law. As a result, GUCL does not meet the requirements for ABA approval.

GUCL has been located in a two story brick building since 1970.  The building was constructed in 1941 by Los Angeles County for use by the Health Department and as a County Courthouse.

Academics and publications 
GUCL confers undergraduate (BS in Law) and graduate (Juris Doctor) degrees in law. GUCL publishes the Glendale Law Review, a scholarly journal that is indexed in the Index of Legal Periodicals.

People

Notable current/former faculty
 Stephen G. Larson, former United States District Court judge; adjunct assistant professor from 1997 to 2001
 James E. Rogan, former United States Congressman 105th and 106th Congresses and former United States Under Secretary of Commerce for Intellectual Property and Director of the United States Patent and Trademark Office from 2001 to 2004; adjunct professor of criminal law from 1988 to 1995

Notable alumni
 Patricia Morrow, former actress

References

External links
 

Law schools in California
Educational institutions established in 1967
Universities and colleges in Los Angeles County, California
Education in Glendale, California
Buildings and structures in Glendale, California
Private universities and colleges in California
For-profit universities and colleges in the United States